Jo Min-su (born January 29, 1965) is a South Korean actress. She is best known for her role in the Kim Ki-duk film Pietà.

Career
She debuted in 1986 via the KBS TV Cultural Center, then appeared first on the big screen in Chung: Blue Sketch. But her public profile grew more through her television roles than movies, culminating in a Best Actress trophy in the 1989 KBS Drama Awards. Among her other notable TV series were Sandglass, Daemang (also known as Great Ambition), and Piano. After her marriage in 2005, she took a break from her acting career, but returned four years later with a memorable performance in Will It Snow for Christmas?.

But 2012 would prove to be the now-veteran actress's breakthrough year. Though she initially had reservations about doing a film by controversial auteur Kim Ki-duk, Jo became thankful to Kim for giving her the chance "to work with new material from what I was used to in the past. There aren't too many roles that women my age can do. They all seem the same. But this role was different." Her performance in Pietà brought her rave reviews and praise at the Venice Film Festival, as well as from domestic critics and audiences, notably a Best Actress trophy at the Grand Bell Awards. She was also awarded the prestigious Okgwan Order of Cultural Merit.

Filmography

Film

Television series

Hosting

Music video

Awards and nominations

References

External links

 Jo Min-su at Management Koo 
 
 
 

Living people
1965 births
Actresses from Seoul
20th-century South Korean actresses
21st-century South Korean actresses
South Korean film actresses
South Korean television actresses